Pechenkino is a rural locality (a selo) and the administrative centre of Berezovsky Selsoviet, Birsky District, Bashkortostan, Russia. The population was 446 as of 2010. There are 9 streets.

Geography 
Pechenkino is located 35 km southwest of Birsk (the district's administrative centre) by road. Staroyezhovo is the nearest rural locality.

References 

Rural localities in Birsky District